Bagbati massacre refers to the killings of more than 200 unarmed Bengali Hindus by the Al Badar, Pakistan Army, Razakars and Peace Committee, in the Bagbati Union of Sirajganj sub-division in the erstwhile district of greater Pabna in May 1971. After the massacre the bodies were buried or dumped in wells.

Background 
Bagbati Union was situated 14 km to the north west of Sirajganj sub-divisional headquarters. It is now under Sirajganj Sadar Upazila of Sirajganj District. When the Pakistan Army launched the Operation Searchlight and moved in to Sirajganj, hundreds of Bengali from Sirajganj and the surrounding areas took refuge in the villages of Bagbati, Harinagopal, Pipulberia and Dhaldob under Bagbati Union. A day before the massacre, a meeting was held at Ghorachara School between the Razakars and the Peace Committee. At the meeting it was decided that more than 500 people of Bagbati, Haringopal and Alokdia would be eliminated.

Killings 
On the early morning of 27 May, in a joint operation the Pakistani army, Al Badr, Razakars and the Peace Committee, surrounded the villages. The Al Badrs opened fire indiscriminately and killed more than two hundred people, mostly Bengali Hindus. Numerous residences were looted on set on fire by the Al Badr, Razakars and the Peace Committee. The Pakistan Army raped the womenfolk. Days after the massacre, the survivors dumped the dead bodies in the wells of the deserted houses of the erstwhile landlords of Bagbati and Dhaldob.

Commemoration 
The victims of the massacre are remembered through memorial services every year. A few years back a small memorial was constructed in one of the wells where the victims bodies were dumped, in a joint initiative between the Bagbati Union Parishad and the locals. The locals have demanded the restoration of the mass killing site and the mass graves.

See also 
 Demra massacre

References 

Massacres of Bengali Hindus in East Pakistan
1971 in Bangladesh
1971 Bangladesh genocide
Persecution of Hindus
Persecution by Muslims
Massacres in 1971
1971 in Pakistan
Massacres committed by Pakistan in East Pakistan
May 1971 events in Bangladesh